Qiniq may refer to:

Qiniq (tribe), a historical Oghuz Turkic tribe
Qiniq (company), a Canadian communications company